Castle Durrow is an 18th-century country house in Durrow, County Laois, Ireland. The house was built in the pre-Palladian design and formal gardens that were popular in the 18th century.

History
The house was built between 1712-1716 by Colonel William Flower (from 1733 Baron Castle Durrow) as a family home. In 1751 William's son Henry was created first Viscount Ashbrook, also in the Irish peerage, and the title is still extant, being held by his direct heir, Michael Flower, eleventh Viscount Ashbrook (b. 1935).

The Flower family retained ownership of the estate until 1922, when they were forced to sell up and return to England. It was bought by a Mr. Maher of Freshford, County Kilkenny who was primarily interested in the estate's timber reserves. Eventually, the Irish Land Commission took over the arable portion of the property and the Forestry Department took over the woodland.

After standing empty for some years the house itself was transformed in 1929 into a school (St Fintan's College and Convent) and in 1998 was purchased by Peter and Shelley Stokes and redeveloped as the luxury Castle Durrow Country House Hotel.

References

Bibliography
 Godson, Julie Ann, "The Water Gypsy. How a Thames fishergirl became a viscountess" (FindARead.com, 2014). A biography of Betty Ridge (1745-1808) who married the 2nd Viscount Ashbrook (1744-1780), and history of the Ridge and Flower families

Buildings and structures in County Laois